Shaun Murphy (born 1982) is an English snooker player.

Shaun Murphy may also refer to:
 Shaun Murphy (soccer) (born 1970), Australian former soccer player
 Shaun Murphy (hurler) (born 1990), Irish hurling player
 Shaun Murphy (singer) (born 1948), aka Stoney, American female singer
 Dr. Shaun Murphy, a character on the TV series The Good Doctor

See also
 The Shaun Murphy Band, a blues band
 Sean Murphy (disambiguation)
 Shawn Murphy (disambiguation)